Riki van Steeden (born 24 December 1976) is a former professional association football player, who played as a defender. He was part of the Auckland City team at the 2009 FIFA Club World Cup, and played five times for the New Zealand national team in 1997.

Club career
He played for both Nelson Suburbs and Christchurch Technical before he moved to Australia to join Carlton SC. In 1999, he joined the Football Kingz for their inaugural season in the National Soccer League, making 46 appearances and being credited with five goals.

International career
Van Steeden made his full debut for the New Zealand national team in a 1–0 win over Fiji on 7 June 1997. He earned five international caps, scoring one goal. His final cap was a substitute appearance in a 5–0 loss to Indonesia on 21 September that same year.

Outside football
Away from playing, Van Steeden works as a television producer. He worked for Sky New Zealand, before joining HBS, the company that has provided host broadcasting services for FIFA tournaments since 2002.

References

External links
 Riki van Steeden Interview
 
 

1976 births
Living people
Sportspeople from Nelson, New Zealand
New Zealand people of Dutch descent
New Zealand association footballers
New Zealand international footballers
Expatriate soccer players in Australia
Auckland City FC players
Carlton S.C. players
Football Kingz F.C. players
National Soccer League (Australia) players
Nelson Suburbs players
Association football defenders